The qualification for the 2016 Men's Olympic Handball Tournament was held from January 2015 to April 2016. Twelve teams qualified, the hosts, the world champion, four continental event winners and six teams from the World Olympic qualification tournaments respectively.

Qualification summary

Legend for qualification type

Host country

World Championship

Continental qualification

Europe (1st ranking continent)

Asia (2nd ranking continent)
The tournament was held from 14 to 27 November 2015 in Doha, Qatar. It included Oceania champion's Australia.

All times are local (UTC+3).

Preliminary round

Group A

Group B

Knockout stage

5th place bracket

9–11th place semifinal

5–8th place semifinals

Semifinals

Ninth place game

Seventh place game

Fifth place game

Third place game

Final

Final ranking

America (3rd ranking continent)

Africa (4th ranking continent)

Olympic Qualification Tournaments
The Olympic Qualification Tournaments were held on 8–10 April 2016. Only twelve teams that have not yet qualified through the five events mentioned above could play in the tournament:

The top six teams from the World championship that did not already qualify through their continental championships were eligible to participate in the tournament.
The best ranked teams of each continent in the World championship represented the continent in order to determine the continental ranking. The first ranked continent received two more places for the tournament. The second, third and fourth ranked continent received one place each. The last place belongs to a team from Oceania, if one was ranked between 8th–12th at the World Championship. As no team from Oceania met this condition, the second ranked continent received an extra place instead. The teams that already earned their places through their World championship ranking will not be considered for receiving places through the continental criterion.
The twelve teams were allocated in three pools of four teams according to the table below. The top two teams from each pool qualified for the 2016 Olympic Games.

2016 Olympic Qualification Tournament #1

All times are local (UTC+2).

2016 Olympic Qualification Tournament #2

All times are local (UTC+2).

2016 Olympic Qualification Tournament #3

All times are local (UTC+2).

References

External links
Qualification System

Men's qualification
Handball Men
Olympic Qualification Men
Olympics